Mumbai Xpress is a 2005 Indian black comedy film directed by Singeetam Srinivasa Rao and produced by Kamal Haasan. It stars Kamal Haasan himself in the lead role alongside Manisha Koirala. The music was composed by Ilaiyaraaja, while Siddharth Ramaswamy and Ashmith Kunder handled the cinematography and editing respectively. The film was simultaneously made in Tamil and Hindi with the same title. The lead pair, as well as Sharat Saxena, Ramesh Aravind, Hardik Thakar, and Dheena, were retained for the Hindi version. In the Hindi version, Vijay Raaz, Dinesh Lamba, Om Puri, Saurabh Shukla and Pratima Kazmi reprise the roles played by Pasupathy, Vaiyapuri, Nassar, Santhana Bharathi and Kovai Sarala, respectively.

Plot 
Three amateur thieves plot to kidnap the young son of wealthy Chettiar (Santhana Bharathi - Tamil) / Mehta (Saurabh Shukla - Hindi)  from school. They do a trial run. However, on the eve of the kidnap, the guy whose job is to operate a crane (Dheena Chandra Dhas) in this plan is hospitalized. The services of Avinasi (Tamil) / Avinash (Hindi) a.k.a. Mumbai Xpress (Kamal Haasan), brother of Durga (Kovai Sarala - Tamil) / (Pratima Kazmi - Hindi), a deaf yet a docile stuntman who performs daredevil bike acts, is hired. Twists and turns take place where the other two gang members are hurt, and invariably, the Mumbai Xpress is left to perform the task all by himself. He kidnaps the wrong boy Daddu (Hardhik Thakkar), the illegitimate son of Ahalya (Manisha Koirala) and police officer Rao (Nassar - Tamil) / (Om Puri - Hindi), but manages to get a huge ransom from Chettiar by default. A brawl takes place between the original kidnap planners - Chidambaram (Pasupathy - Tamil) / Digambar (Vijay Raaz - Hindi), Johnson (Vaiyapuri - Tamil) / (Dinesh Lamba - Hindi), and Avinasi / Avinash - in handling Ahalya's child, but Avinasi / Avinash delivers the child unhurt to his mother. He eavesdrops into her tele-con with Rao where Rao wants to settle both the ransom and sever his ties with her. Ahalya pleads and coaxes him to help her get the ransom, which Rao is willing to pay. The child takes a fancy to Avinasi / Avinash and wants him to be the man in their life, and gets him to agree (or else he would throw himself from a multi-storied building). Ahalya wants either Rao's or Chettiar / Mehta's money which Avinasi / Avinash is holding, whereas Avinasi / Avinash is in love and wants to be that protective person. Rao appoints Chettiar / Mehta  to handle the ransom and what follows is a series of humorous mix-ups. In the end, all settle their differences and become the board of directors of Avinasi / Avinash's Mumbai Express, a mega-bar owned by Avinasi / Avinash and Ahalya, now married, to a happy ending.

Cast

Tamil version

Kamal Haasan as Avinasi / Avinash (Mumbai Xpress)
Manisha Koirala as Ahalya
Nassar as ACP S.P. Rao
Santhana Bharathi as Chettiar
Ramesh Aravind as Thambhu, Insurance agent
Pasupathy as Chidambaram
Sharat Saxena as Inspector Saxena
Kovai Sarala as Durga, Avinasi's sister
Dheena as Raju
Vaiyapuri as Johnson
Raza Murad as Rao's relative
Hardik Thakar as Hardhik (Daddu)

Hindi version
All characters mentioned above in the Tamil version are the same in the Hindi version except Avinasi's name is Avinash and the characters played by Nassar, Bharathi, Pasupathy, Sarala, and Vaiyapuri have been played by different actors.

 Om Puri as ACP S.P. Rao
 Saurabh Shukla as Kishore Mehta
 Pratima Kazmi as Durga
 Dinesh Lamba as Johnson
 Vijay Raaz as Digambar

Production 
In May 2004,  Kamal Haasan and Singeetham Sreenivasa Rao were keen to make a Hindi and Tamil bilingual film titled Kumar Sambhavam with Madhuri Dixit as the lead actress. Kamal Haasan stated he needed a "woman of substance who would look convincing as a wife and mother" and stated there was "no second choice" for the role. Bharat Shah was set to finance the project and negotiated terms with Dixit to work on the project, having earlier worked with her during the making of Devdas (2002).

The film was dropped after Dixit quoted a salary, which was more than the whole cost of the film itself. Kamal Haasan later expressed his disappointment at the film not materialising as a result of Dixit's refusal.
He later agreed to work with Rao on another proposed film titled KG alongside Ramesh Aravind, but it also was dropped.

Kamal Haasan then decided to fund the film and Crazy Mohan was approached to write the dialogues, though the writer later pulled out of the venture as he went for a tour to United States. Tabu initially turned down the offer citing date problems. In October 2004, it was reported that Kamal Haasan had agreed to act in Singeetham Srinivasa Rao's next film, which was retitled Mumbai Xpress. The film was officially announced on 8 November 2004, where Kamal Haasan revealed that the film would be made in Tamil and Hindi, with the former version also featuring Nassar, Pasupathy and Vaiyapuri while the latter would include Mahesh Manjrekar, Om Puri and Saurabh Shukla in its cast.

The team faced further problems though trying to find a heroine for the film with Bipasha Basu, Sridevi, Tabu and then Kajol also turning down the opportunity to star in the bilingual. Basu later stated she was unsure if audiences would accept her in the role of a mother of a 10-year-old boy, citing this as the reason she refused the film. Finally in mid November 2004, the team agreed terms with Manisha Koirala and the actress flew to Chennai to take part in a photo shoot. Vijay Raaz also subsequently replaced Manjrekar, while a ten-year-old boy, Hardhik Thakar, was added to the cast. During production the film faced criticism for having an English title, though Kamal Haasan remained undisturbed by the controversy.

During the making of the film, Kamal Haasan suffered a minor injury which resulted in severe bruising, though his co-passenger on the motorbike in the stunt escaped injury.

Soundtrack 

The soundtrack was composed by Illayaraja, the Tamil lyrics were written by Vaali, and the Hindi lyrics were written by Dev Kohli.Kamal Haasan launched an audio company called Rajkamal Audios, just to release the film's music and held a special opening event at Prasad Labs.

Tamil version

Hindi version

Release 
The film geared up for a 14 April release clashing with the Rajinikanth starrer Chandramukhi and the Vijay starrer Sachein. 

The film opened to positive reviews across 321 screens. RaajKamal Films International was successful in having the first digital film implemented (shot in the pioneering Red epic camera) a no-profit no-loss affair thus opening up a new path for potential filmmakers and India's foray into the digital film making.

Even though the film won good reviews, the cinematography had been done experimentally with a digital movie camera and mainly due to the digital film implementation resulting in a slight dark output which left the viewer uneasy. The film, although widely considered a loss, was a great success technology-wise in the Indian cinema industry.

Reception

Critical Response 
Regarding the Hindi version, Baradwaj Rangan praised the film calling it "one of Kamal Haasan's most tight-knit, most convoluted screenplays, where every pratfall, every pun, every preposterous moment seems to have been spat on, polished, and precisely positioned into an overall jigsaw pattern". He added that "Mumbai Xpress isn't exactly an all-out comedy. Like Pushpak, it's the blues with belly laughs, a stack of serious issues coated with smiles." Nikhat Kazmi of The Times of India gave the film 2.5 stars out of 5, writing "Other than that occasional laugh, there isn't much to lift your spirits or tickle your ribs." Sneha May Francis of Rediff.com reviewing the Hindi version gave a mixed review, writing "To sum it up, Mumbai Xpress is a poor man's superhero movie and an out-and-out children's flick. If you are the kind looking for intelligent humour, this one is not for you. After taking you through such a long ride, the movie ends abruptly, leaving you thinking that the joke was on you for watching the film!" while Siddhu Warrier reviewing the Tamil version gave a positive review, writing "The dialogues are the highlight of the movie -- almost every line elicits a guffaw. The jokes, bucking today's trend, are not ribald and risqué, but of the kind that would get even the average 10 year old kicking the back of the seat in front of him in joy (of course, much to my dismay)." Visual Dasan of Kalki reviewing Tamil version called it "A modern comedy express to celebrate summer with family".

Box office 
According to Ibosnetwork, India's leading box-office portal, Mumbai Xpress collected  in the Hindi Belt alone, while Box Office India certified the film as a Flop as it netted only  from the North Indian region.

References

External links 
 
 
 

2005 black comedy films
Indian multilingual films
2005 films
Films scored by Ilaiyaraaja
2000s Tamil-language films
2000s Hindi-language films
Indian black comedy films
Films directed by Singeetam Srinivasa Rao
Films with screenplays by Kamal Haasan
Films set in Mumbai
Films shot in Mumbai
2005 multilingual films
2005 comedy films